The Merlin Effect is the third book in Adventures of Kate trilogy by T. A. Barron. It was preceded by Heartlight and The Ancient One. The hardcover version of this book was published by Ace Books in 2004. The Adventures of Kate books are stand alone and can be read in any order.

Plot introduction
Kate Gordon travels to a remote lagoon in Baja California, hoping to help her father discover a sunken ship that disappeared centuries ago. In time, she learns that the ship may have carried a mysterious drinking horn out of Arthurian legend, which possibly ended Merlin himself. As she explores alone in her kayak, Kate encounters several pieces of the puzzle: a terrible whirlpool, a group of ever-singing whales, a seemingly ageless fish, and a prophecy that, under certain conditions, the ancient ship may rise and sail again. She plunges into an undersea world of bizarre creatures and terrifying foes. But to save the life of her father, she must find some way to regain her own free will, and to succeed where even Merlin failed.

Characters in The Merlin Effect
 Kate: A 13-year-old girl, who has proven herself worthy time and time again. She is currently assisting her father look for a sunken ship that may contain gold and silver. First appeared in Heartlight.
 Geoffry: an old man who had sunken with the ship called the Resurrection. He is actually Merlin.

-When The Merlin Effect begins, Terry is introduced as a very negative and self-centered person. Time and again, he chooses himself, or his instruments, over other people. As the novel continues, Terry has a change of heart and becomes more caring and compassionate toward other people.

Other Books Written by T.A. Barron
Merlin Saga, Including:
 Merlin Book 1: The Lost Years
 Merlin Book 9: The Great Tree of Avalon, originally published as Child of the Dark Prophecy

2004 American novels
2004 children's books
American children's novels
American fantasy novels
Children's fantasy novels
Modern Arthurian fiction
Novels set in California
American picture books